is a village located in Sōya Subprefecture, Hokkaido, Japan.

As of September 2014, the village has an estimated population of 2,884 and a density of 4.91 persons per km². The total area is 590.00 km².

Geography
Sarufutsu is the northernmost village in Japan and is the largest village in Hokkaido in area. Located on the Tonbetsu Plain, it faces the Sea of Okhotsk to the east where, during the winter, there is drift ice. 80% of the village's total area is covered by forests.
 Mountains: Mount Horoshiri
 Rivers: Sarufutsu River
 Lakes: Poro Swamp, Kamuito Swamp, Mokeuni Swamp

Settlements/Localities in Sarufutsu
Ashino (芦野)
Asajino (浅茅野)
Chiraibetsu (知来別)
Hamaonishibetsu (浜鬼志別)
Hamasarufutsu (浜猿払)
Onishibetsu (鬼志別)(Town Hall is located here)
Koishi (小石)

Neighbouring municipalities
 Hokkaido
 Wakkanai
 Toyotomi
 Hamatonbestu
 Horonobe

Climate

Economy
Sarufutsu is famous for its large and particularly excellent scallops, among other seafood. Likewise, a relatively large part of the village is utilized for dairy farming. Sarufutsu has a fledgling tourist industry, as it is a highlight for motor bikers in the summer, who stop overnight at one of the biker camps. The tourist center is located a few kilometers south of Hamaonishibetsu.

History

World War II
During World War II, many Korean prisoners of war were sent to Sarufutsu, where they were kept as a labor force building an air field in Asajino. Approximately 80 Korean prisoners of war died over the course of construction from abuse or malnutrition. The air field was never completed, and since that time, has almost completely vanished. In recent year, the village made attempts to construct a monument in memory of the Korean prisoners who died there. However, construction was cancelled after Japanese nationalists orchestrated a protest movement via the internet.  The village office was overwhelmed with threatening phone calls, who called the office workers traitors, and threatened the village with a boycott of its scallop industry.

Settlements

Koishi
In the 1960s to early-1970s, Koishi was the largest settlement in Sarufutsu with several thousand people working in the coal industry. It had its own hospital, as well as a movie theater. With the decline of the coal industry across Japan, the population also drastically dropped in Koishi, and its current population is less than 50 people.

Asajino
As previously mentioned, Asajino was the potential site for an air field during World War II.

Education
Primary Schools
 Onishibestu Elementary School
 Hamaonishibestu  Elementary School
 Hamasarufutsu Elementary School (closed spring 2015)
 Asajino Elementary School
 Ashino Elementary School (closed spring 2017)
 Chiraibetstu Elementary School
 Junior High Schools
 Takushin Junior High School

Transportion
Sarufutsu Station
Onishibetsu Station

Recreation
Onishibetsu Sports Center has weekly sports activities for residents and guests.

Summer
Onishibetsu swimming pool is open during the summer into early fall.

Winter
Onishibetsu has a small single-lift ski hill.

Mascot

He is a Japanese macaque who moved to Hokkaido. He is a skilled dancer and scallop sculptor. He also likes to travel around the world. His favourite foods are scallops and milk.

See also
 Esanbe Hanakita Kojima (エサンベ鼻北小島) formerly an island, now underwater

References

 https://www.nytimes.com/2014/10/29/world/asia/japanese-village-grappling-with-wartime-sins-comes-under-attack.html?_r=0

External links

Official Website 

Villages in Hokkaido